Autograph  is a 2004 Indian Tamil-language romantic drama film written, produced and directed by Cheran. The film's soundtrack is composed by Bharadwaj. Cheran also plays the lead role in his film for first time, and other cast members include Gopika, Sneha, and Mallika.

The film was released in India in February 2004, and was screened at the Lyon Asian Film Festival in France and at the Montreal World Film Festival in Canada. Upon release, the film met with critical acclaim and commercial success. Although a sequel to the film titled Autograph 2 was announced, it never materialised. The film was remade in Telugu as Naa Autograph, Kannada as My Autograph and Bengali as Amar Aponjon.

Plot
The film begins with Senthil Kumar (Cheran) who runs an advertising agency, boarding a train on a journey to invite his friends and family for his forthcoming wedding. Along the way, he encounters various individuals from his past, who bring back memories of three women that have influenced his love life. During the journey, he reminisces his teenage days. The happenings in the school, his tussle with his friends and his first love with his classmate Kamala (Mallika) are all pictured with fun and drama. However, her father married her off early before her 11th grade. He meets Kamala 14 years later, and she is now a mother of three children, and a wife of a Farmer. Senthil reaches the village and invites all including Kamala, who promises to come to the wedding.

Then, he goes to Kerala, where he had his college education. His major crush at that time was Lathika (Gopika), a Malayali girl from Chalakudy, with whom he falls in love, but later, the affair proves to be short-lived as her parents marry her off to her cousin Madhavan after knowing about her love affair with Senthil. On reaching Chalakudy to invite her, Senthil is slightly disturbed to see her as a widow living with her grandmother for the past 12 years. He attempts to rekindle his love for her, but she corrects him.

On his journey, he comes across his trusted friend Divya (Sneha), who instills confidence and elucidates him to the life lesson – that one has to go ahead in life without looking back. While she and Senthil travel on a bus, she reveals her tragic experience, that her mother is a paralytic patient and that she is the breadwinner of the family. As time passes by, she reveals that she was in love with someone and believed that he was the man of her life, but she was unfortunately let down. A poetic narration on the need for a good companion like Senthil who gives attention to her is stressed, even if it is not possible at his stage. After her unwilling engagement with a businessman from America, she goes away from Senthil. Senthil meets her five years later, and she is now a divorcee.

In the end, Senthil marries a girl of his parents choice, Thenmozhi (Kanika). All the three girls who were a part in his life, along with his school and college friends attend his wedding. Also, this sets a very jovial ending to the story.

Cast

Production
Produced by Roja Combines, Cheran first cast Prabhu Deva in the lead role during October 2000 but the actor and producers later left the project. In December 2000, Cheran announced that he would produce the film himself and that actor Vijay would portray the lead role in the project. However, Vijay later opted out as a result of scheduling problems. Arvind Swami revealed that he was offered the main role, but he declined the role because he retired from cinema that time period.

Cheran said that the film was partly autobiographical. Four different cinematographers worked on the film; Ravi Varman had shot the school episode in Senthil's early life with a 35 mm lens for which he used light angle, Vijay Milton shot the Kerala scenes, Dwaraknath shot the Chennai episode with a steady cam, and Shanky Mahendran shot the "'live' part" of the film when the camera uses the point of view of Senthil's character.

Awards
The film has won the following awards since its release:

52nd National Film Awards (India)
 Won – Golden Lotus Award – Best Popular Film Providing Wholesome Entertainment – Cheran
 Won – Silver Lotus Award – Best Female Playback Singer – K. S. Chithra
 Won – Silver Lotus Award – Best Lyrics – Pa. Vijay

52nd Filmfare Awards South
 Won – Best Film – Tamil
 Won – Best Director – Tamil – Cheran
 Won – Best Supporting Actress – Tamil – Mallika
 Won – Best Music Director – Tamil – Bharadwaj

Tamil Nadu State Film Awards
 Won – Best Film
 Won – Best Director – Cheran
 Won – Best Female Playback – K. S. Chithra

Soundtrack
The soundtrack features eight songs composed by Bharadwaj, with lyrics by Pa. Vijay, Snehan and Cheran. The film's background was scored by the famous duo Sabesh–Murali.

The song Ovvoru Pookalume also featured the performance of the members of Raaga Priya orchestra which also included its founder Comagan.

Critical reception 
Sify wrote, "A major plus point of Autograph is that Cheran has chosen three cameramen to do the three episodes in his life which makes the film lively and nostalgic." Dennis Harvey of Variety wrote, "Well-mounted production has too much familiar melodrama, and few real highlights (notably one delightful homage to ’70s Tamil musicals), but remains an easy watch." G Dhananjayan in his book Pride of Tamil Cinema wrote "A trend setting film recollecting love memoirs in various phases of life". Visual Dasan of Kalki wrote that Cheran's creative maturity, re-emerging not only as an actor but also as a fine artist, was recorded as an art form in Autograph.

Remakes

References

External links
 

2004 films
Films directed by Cheran
Tamil films remade in other languages
2004 romantic drama films
Films shot in Kerala
Films shot in Thiruvananthapuram
Films shot in Kochi
Films shot in Chalakudy
Films shot in Thrissur
Films shot in Alappuzha
Films shot in Karnataka
2000s Tamil-language films
Indian romantic drama films
Indian nonlinear narrative films
Films scored by Bharadwaj (composer)
Best Popular Film Providing Wholesome Entertainment National Film Award winners
Indian remakes of foreign films